The 2015 United Kingdom general election in England was held on Thursday, 7 May 2015 for 533 English seats to the House of Commons. The Conservatives won a majority of seats in England for the second time since 1992.

Both major parties made gains at the expense of the Liberal Democrats, whose support collapsed to its lowest level since 1970. Their vote share declined by 16 percentage points, and the party lost 37 of its 43 seats. The party won 6 seats and 8% of the vote overall. This was the worst result for the Lib Dems or the Liberals in 45 years, while the 16-point drop in vote share was the biggest decline in Lib Dem or Liberal support since 1931.

Although Labour increased their share of the vote by 4% and gained 15 seats, the Conservatives made 21 gains for a total of 318, including winning 6 seats directly from Labour. Together with seats from Scotland and Wales, this allowed the Conservatives to form a majority government with 330 seats, leading to the first majority Conservative government since 1992.

Political context
The general election was fought with the Conservatives and the Liberal Democrats having been in coalition since 2010, with Labour being the main opposition, though with the Conservatives holding the majority of English seats. It was also fought following the victory of the UK Independence Party at the European Parliament Elections and in two by-elections the year before, along with George Galloway of the Respect Party having won the 2012 Bradford West by-election from Labour.

Results summary

Analysis
The Conservatives emerged as the largest party, increasing both their seats and votes. They took seats both from the Liberal Democrats and from the Labour Party, as well as holding on to many of their key marginal seats.

Labour increased its numbers both in number of votes and seats after making gains against the Liberal Democrats, along with limited gains against the Conservatives, but failed to become the largest party. Shadow Chancellor Ed Balls lost his seat in Morley and Outwood to the Conservative candidate Andrea Jenkyns, whilst Ed Miliband resigned as Labour leader.

The Liberal Democrats lost the vast majority of their seats, going from 43 seats down to just 6. Leader Nick Clegg, who saw his nearly 30-point majority in Sheffield Hallam massively reduced to 4.2%, resigned on the morning of the election results.

UKIP made large gains in the percentage of votes, but failed to retain Rochester and Strood or take any other seats, leading to the resignation of party leader Nigel Farage. His resignation was rejected, however, and he subsequently stayed on.

The Green Party increased their share of the vote and held Brighton Pavilion, but failed to gain any new seats.

Regional results
Regional vote shares and changes are sourced from the House of Commons Library.

East Midlands

East of England

London

North East

North West

South East

South West

West Midlands

Yorkshire and the Humber

Campaign events
 31 March: First official day of the general election campaign
 13 April: The Labour Party launches its manifesto
 14 April: The Conservative Party and the Green Party launch their manifestos
 15 April: UKIP and the Liberal Democrats launch their manifestos
 7 May: BBC Exit poll shows the Conservatives as the largest single party
 8 May: The Conservatives emerge as the largest party in England, gaining a majority of MPs in the House of Commons and forming the next Government of the United Kingdom as a majority, contrary to predictions made at the start of the election campaign.

Target seats
The recorded swing in each case is calculated as two-way swing from the party that won in 2010 to the party targeting the seat. Negative swing implies that the targeting party lost votes to the incumbent party.

Conservative Party

Labour Party

Liberal Democrats

UKIP

Green Party
Swing for the Greens is measured as one-party swing, i.e. the change in the party's share of the vote.

Opinion polling

Endorsements

Donations
Electoral commission data shows that in 2015 Q2, total donations for each major political party, over £7,500, are as follows:

See also
 2015 United Kingdom general election in Northern Ireland
 2015 United Kingdom general election in Scotland
 2015 United Kingdom general election in Wales

References

External links
 

England
United Kingdom General Election Results in Scotland, 2015
2015